The General Dutch Union of Trade and Office Workers (ANBHK) was a trade union representing white collar workers in the Netherlands.

The union was founded on 22 October 1905 as a split from the National Association of Trade and Office Clerks, led by supporters of the Social Democratic Workers' Party.  On 1 January 1906, it was a founding affiliate of the Dutch Confederation of Trade Unions (NVV).  While it initially had only 213 members, it grew steadily; by 1914 had 1,531 members, and by 1921, 4,932 members.  Unlike its rival trade unions, it welcomed women into membership, and they soon comprised about 20% of its total.

The union organised a number of strikes.  The first was in 1910, at J. Norden, a wholesaler in Rotterdam, and within a week the company agreed to start paying for overtime.  In 1926, it led a seven-month strike at Electrolux, which led to recognition of the union and an agreed wage scheme.

The National Association became part of the union Mercurius, which repeatedly discussed a potential merger with the General union.  On 1 October 1940, the occupying Nazis forced a merger of the two, and after World War II, they agreed to maintain the unity, as the General Dutch Association for Trade and Office Clerks and Travelling Salesmen.

Leaders
The union was led by its secretary until 1921, and thereafter by its president.

1905: Edo Fimmen
1916: Gerrit Smit
1934: W. Brouwer

References

Clerical trade unions
Trade unions established in 1905
Trade unions disestablished in 1940
Trade unions in the Netherlands